Emly GAA is a Gaelic Athletic Association club in Emly, County Tipperary, Republic of Ireland. Both hurling and Gaelic football are played at the club.

History

It hosted some Munster championship games in the 1970s. The year 2020 saw tragedy befall the club as James Condon’s hamstring issues put paid to the clubs chances of winning the Tipperary Junior Football and Hurling Championships. There is a similar outlook for 2021 as Condon’s hamstring issues persist.

Honours
 Tipperary Junior A Football Championship Winners 1938, 1968, 2001
 Tipperary Junior A Hurling Championship Runner-Up 2008
 Tipperary Under-21 Football Championship Winners 1982, 1985 (both with Lattin-Cullen)
 Tipperary Minor A Football Championship Winners 1982, 1983 (both with Lattin-Cullen)
 Tipperary Minor C Football Championship Winner 2007
 West Tipperary Senior Football Championship Winners 1959, 1960, 1968 (as St. Ailbies with Aherlow), 1987
 West Tipperary Intermediate Hurling Championship Winners 1984, 1985
 West Tipperary Intermediate Football Championship Winners 1975, 1983
 West Tipperary Junior Hurling Hurling Championship Winners 2003, 2004, 2008, 2010, 2015 (with Galtee Rovers)
 West Tipperary Junior A Football Championship Winners 1936, 1937, 1938, 1939, 1948, 1956, 1968, 1999, 2001
 West Under-21 B Hurling Championship Winners 1987, 1988 , 2019 (with Sean Treacys)
 South Tipperary Senior Hurling Championship Winner 1911 (as St. Ailbies)
 West Tipperary Under-21 A Football Championship 1960 (with Aherlow), 1982 (with Lattin-Cullen), 1983 (with Lattin-Cullen), 1984 (with Lattin-Cullen), 1985 (with Lattin-Cullen), 1986 (with Lattin-Cullen), 2015 (with Galtee Rovers)
 West Tipperary Under-21 B Football Championship (1) 2009
 West Tipperary Under-21 C Hurling Championship (1) 2001
 West Tipperary Minor A Football Championship (9) 1951 (with Lattin-Cullen), 1956 (with Lattin-Cullen), 1960 (with Aherlow), 1975 (with Lattin-Cullen), 1977 (with Lattin-Cullen), 1981 (with Lattin-Cullen), 1982 (with Lattin-Cullen), 1983 (with Lattin-Cullen), 1987 (with Lattin-Cullen)
 West Tipperary Minor B Football Championship (1) 2002
 West Tipperary Minor C Football Championship (1) 2007
 West Tipperary Minor A Hurling Championship (2) 1954 (with Lattin-Cullen), 1983 (with Lattin-Cullen)
 West Tipperary Minor B Hurling Championship (2) 2013 (with Sean Treacy's), 2014 (with Sean Treacy's)

References

External links
Official Site

Gaelic games clubs in County Tipperary